William Evans "Bill" Gortney (born September 25, 1955) is a retired United States Navy admiral who served as the sixth commander of United States Northern Command and the 23rd commander of North American Aerospace Defense Command (NORAD). He previously served as the Commander, United States Fleet Forces Command from  September 14, 2012 to December 2014 and Director of the Joint Staff from July 1, 2010 to August 2012. Prior to that, he served as Commander, U.S. Naval Forces Central Command/5th Fleet. He assumed his post as CDRUSNORTHCOM and commander of NORAD on December 5, 2014, and was succeeded by General Lori Robinson on May 13, 2016.

Early life and education
Gortney was born on September 25, 1955, and graduated from Elon College (now Elon University) in North Carolina, earning a Bachelor of Arts in History and Political Science in 1977. He was an officer of Kappa Sigma fraternity and a member of the varsity soccer team and the rugby club. The son of a retired United States Navy captain and a second generation Naval Aviator, Gortney entered the United States Navy as an aviation officer candidate at Aviation Officer Candidate School (AOCS, Class 12–77 [The Gamesmen]) in the summer of 1977 at NAS Pensacola, Florida.

Career
Gortney received his commission in the United States Naval Reserve in September 1977 and earned his wings of gold and designation as a Naval Aviator following graduation from the jet strike pilot training pipeline in December 1978. Shore assignments include Training Squadron 26 (VT-26), NAS Chase Field, Texas, 1978–1980; Strike Fighter Squadron 125 (VFA-125), NAS Lemoore, California, 1984–1988, and aide and flag lieutenant to the Assistant Chief of Naval Operations (Air Warfare), Washington, 1990–1991. He is a 1996 graduate of the Naval War College, earning a Master of Arts in International Security Affairs. Additional command tours include Strike Fighter Squadron 15 (VFA-15), 1994–1995, on board , and VFA-106, the East Coast F/A-18 Fleet Replacement Squadron, NAS Cecil Field, Florida, 1996–1997. Fleet assignments include Attack Squadron 82 (VA-82), 1981–1984, on board ; VFA-87, 1988–1990, on board USS Theodore Roosevelt; executive officer, VFA-132, 1991–1992, on board  and executive officer, VFA-15, 1992–1994, on board USS Theodore Roosevelt.

In 2015, Gortney ordered "recruiting centers, reserve centers and ROTC facilities to increase surveillance and take basic steps such as closing blinds at the offices," in response to an armed shooting in Tennessee that resulted in the deaths of five US servicemen.

Flag assignments
Gortney's first flag tour was as the Deputy Chief of Staff for Global Force Management and Joint Operations, Fleet Forces Command, Norfolk, Virginia, 2004–2006.  This was followed by assignment as Commander, Carrier Strike Group 10, during which time he was promoted to a two-star rear admiral. Appointed for promotion to vice admiral, he was then assigned as Commander, U.S. Naval Forces Central Command / U.S. 5th Fleet / Combined Maritime Forces. This was Gortney's third command tour in the U.S. Central Command (USCENTCOM) area of operations, supporting Maritime Security Operations and combat operations for Operation Enduring Freedom and Operation Iraqi Freedom.  His previous command assignments in the USCENTCOM area of operations include Command of Carrier Air Wing 7 while he was still a captain, embarked aboard , in direct support of OEF in 2002. His second was as Commander, Carrier Strike Group Ten, on board , in support of Maritime Security Operations and OIF from 2007–2008.

Gortney's experience in the United States Central Command area of operations includes serving on the Joint Staff, J-33 Joint Operations Department CENTCOM Division (JODCENT) from 1998–1999, and tours supporting the violent peace of Operation Southern Watch from 2000–2001 as Deputy for Current Operations, Joint Task Force Southwest Asia (JTF-SWA) at Eskan Village, Saudi Arabia, and deploying as Deputy Commander, Carrier Air Wing 7, on board . He also served as Chief, Naval and Amphibious Liaison Element (NALE) to the Combined Forces Air Component Commander, U.S. Central Command, at Prince Sultan Air Base, Saudi Arabia, for the opening months of the 2003 invasion of Iraq, followed as Chief of Staff for Commander, U.S. Naval Forces Central Command / U.S. 5th Fleet in Bahrain from 2003–2004.

Gortney has flown over 5,360 flight hours and 1,265 carrier-arrested landings, primarily in the A-7E Corsair II and the F/A-18 Hornet.

Awards and decorations

Medals and ribbons

References

|-

|-

|-

|-

|-

1955 births
Elon University alumni
Living people
Recipients of the Legion of Merit
Recipients of the Air Medal
Recipients of the Defense Superior Service Medal
Recipients of the Defense Distinguished Service Medal
Recipients of the Navy Distinguished Service Medal
United States Navy admirals